Michael Gavin Joseph Bisping (born 28 February 1979) is an English actor, sports analyst,  commentator and retired mixed martial artist, who competed in the Middleweight and Light Heavyweight division of the UFC. A professional competitor since 2004, he is a former UFC Middleweight Champion, a former Cage Rage Light Heavyweight Champion and The Ultimate Fighter 3 Light Heavyweight tournament winner. At UFC 78, he became the first British fighter to compete in a UFC main event. At UFC 199, he became the first British fighter to win a UFC Championship. He was inducted into the UFC Hall of Fame on 5 July 2019.

Early life
Bisping was born on a British military base in Nicosia, Cyprus and grew up in Clitheroe, Lancashire. He attended St Augustine's Roman Catholic High School, Billington. His Polish paternal grandfather, Andrew (Andrzej Bobola Bisping von Gallen), through his mother (Countess Marie Josepha Zamoyska), was a member of the noble Zamoyski Family of Poland. Many members of the noble families were pursued and executed by German Nazi forces during World War II; Andrew fled with his family from Poland to England after the German invasion in 1939. Bisping's father, Jan, was in the British Army; his mother is Irish. He began training Jujutsu at the age of eight. In 1994, at the age of 15, he competed as an amateur in Britain's first "no holds barred" competition, a precursor to modern MMA, called Knock Down Sport Budo (KSBO).

At the age of 18, Bisping decided to abandon his martial arts training "to pursue real-life". Less than a year later, Bisping began training in boxing, kickboxing, and karate on the advice of Allan Clarkin, owner of Black Knights Kickboxing, who saw potential in him. Bisping enjoyed a short but successful kickboxing career, winning the North West Area title and later the Pro British light heavyweight kickboxing title. After again briefly quitting competition in 1998, Bisping returned to kickboxing to take the Pro British light heavyweight title for a second time. Soon after winning his second kickboxing title, he was forced to abandon his full-time training for a "real job". In addition to working at factories, slaughterhouses, and demolition companies, he was also an upholsterer, postman, tiler, plasterer, and salesman.

Mixed martial arts career

Early career 
Bisping made his professional mixed martial arts debut at Pride & Glory 2: Battle of the Ages on 4 April 2004, taking a 0:38 submission victory over Steve Mathews. Just one month later, Bisping scored his first knockout against John Weir at UK MMA Challenge 7: Rage & Fury. In his third MMA match, Bisping was scheduled to face the experienced Renato Sobral at Cage Rage 7 but his opponent pulled out ten days before the event. Instead, Bisping defeated Mark Epstein by technical knockout and became the Cage Rage light heavyweight champion. Bisping went on to defend his championship title in a rematch against Epstein at Cage Rage 9 in a knockout victory that solidified Bisping as one of the top light heavyweight fighters in England. It also earned him the moniker "The Great British Hope", by UFC . com.

At The Ultimate Fight Club UK: Natural Instinct on 29 January 2005, Bisping made his cage kickboxing debut against David Brown in a light heavyweight contest. With Brown badly cut, Bisping picked up the win via doctor stoppage in round 2.

Bisping made his debut for the promotion at Ultimate Force on 30 April 2005, defeating Dave Radford to win the vacant Cage Warriors light heavyweight title. Bisping then competed in another light heavyweight cage kickboxing contest, against Cyrille Diabaté at CWFC: Strike Force 1 on 21 May 2005, losing via decision after the end of the first extra round. He captured the FX3 light-heavyweight title on 18 June 2005 and, for a time, reigned over the UK's major federations. In his first Cage Warriors title defense, Bisping defeated Miika Mehmet at CWFC: Strike Force 2, on 16 July 2005.

In September 2005, Cage Rage stripped the light heavyweight title from Bisping due to "management issues", though Cage Warriors stated that "Bisping was willing to defend his title but is being punished by Cage Rage due to his Wolfslair and Cage Warriors links". Towards the end of 2005, Bisping again successfully defended the Cage Warriors title, this time against Jakob Lovstad and Ross Pointon in the CWFC: Strike Force series of events, leading to a record of 10 wins and no losses.

The Ultimate Fighter 3 

In early 2006, Bisping was featured on the UFC's  The Ultimate Fighter 3 reality television series as a contestant training under Tito Ortiz. He won a preliminary bout against Kristian Rothaermel by TKO, followed by a semi-final win against Ross Pointon by submission after landing a flying knee and a series of strikes. In the finals, Bisping finished Josh Haynes by TKO at 4:14 into the second round, making Bisping the second Light Heavyweight winner of The Ultimate Fighter television series.

Ultimate Fighting Championship 
Five months after his victory in the TUF 3 finals, Bisping was slated to fight Eric Schafer at The Ultimate Fighter 4 finale, but withdrew because of problems acquiring his visa. The fight was rescheduled and held on 30 December at UFC 66. Bisping defeated Schafer by TKO at 4:24 in the first round.

On 21 April 2007, Bisping scored a TKO win over Elvis Sinosic at UFC 70 in Manchester, England.

Bisping was a special guest referee at the Cage Warriors events Enter The Wolfslair on 5 March 2005 and CWFC: Strike Force 6 on 27 May 2006.

On 8 September 2007, Bisping faced former Ultimate Fighter 3 rival Matt Hamill in London, England. Bisping won the fight by split decision. The decision was controversial with many believing Hamill won the fight.

Bisping's next match at UFC 78 against fellow Ultimate Fighter winner Rashad Evans resulted in his first loss, via a split decision.

Move down to middleweight

Since the start of his MMA career, people had been advising that Bisping was undersized for the light heavyweight division and would do better at middleweight. With the support of UFC president Dana White, Bisping decided to drop down a weight division, following his loss to Evans. On 19 April 2008 at UFC 83, Bisping made his middleweight debut against Charles McCarthy. Bisping won by TKO, as McCarthy was unable to continue after the first round due to a forearm injury he sustained after receiving an unanswered series of knees and uppercuts from Bisping.

Bisping's next fight was scheduled to be on 7 June 2008 at UFC 85 in London, against Chris Leben. However, after Leben was sentenced to jail for 35 days and unable to compete, Jason Day stepped in. Bisping won the fight in dominant fashion by first round TKO; it was his second 1st round TKO in a row.

Bisping instead fought Leben in the headliner of UFC 89 on 18 October 2008 and won by unanimous decision. After the fight, Leben tested positive for Stanozolol and was suspended for nine months.

Bisping was confirmed as one of the coaches on the ninth season of The Ultimate Fighter. The other coach was the former PRIDE 205lb & 185lb Champion Dan Henderson. After the show's conclusion, Bisping fought Henderson at UFC 100 on 11 July 2009 at Mandalay Bay. The fight was believed to be an eliminator for the UFC Middleweight Championship top contender spot. Bisping was knocked out by Henderson with an overhand right while he was circling to his left. Henderson followed up with a strike after Bisping had fallen to the ground before the fight was stopped. It was Bisping's first knockout loss. Bisping could not remember the fight after the knockout, thinking that the fight was scheduled to take place two months later.

Bisping faced Spirit MC and PRIDE veteran Denis Kang at UFC 105 on 14 November 2009. Bisping won by second round TKO. The fight was awarded Fight of the Night, giving both Kang and Bisping a $40,000 bonus.

Bisping next faced former PRIDE Middleweight Champion Wanderlei Silva at UFC 110 on 21 February 2010. Silva won via unanimous decision.

Bisping defeated Dan Miller by unanimous decision on 29 May 2010 at UFC 114.

Bisping faced and defeated Yoshihiro Akiyama on 16 October 2010 at UFC 120, winning 30–27 on all three judges' scorecards. Though Bisping was rocked early in the fight by Akiyama, he regained his composure and landed combinations repeatedly on Akiyama to sweep all three judges scorecards. The fight was awarded Fight of the Night award.

Bisping faced off in an emotionally charged fight against Jorge Rivera on 26 February 2011 at UFC 127. Both fighters had trash-talked each other before the fight and were restrained at the weigh-in during a verbal argument. Bisping dominated the first round scoring a few takedowns until he delivered an illegal knee to the head of Rivera. A point was taken from Bisping and, after a lengthy halt to the action, the fight continued. The fight ended with a TKO from Bisping in the second round. Bisping spat at Rivera's cornerman after the fight and angrily confronted Rivera about pre-fight comments that Bisping thought disparaged his family. Rivera denied the comments and attempted to make amends but Bisping told him to "go home" and called him a "loser." He immediately apologized in the post-match interview. In the aftermath of the incident Bisping faced "disciplinary actions" and was fined his win bonus. Multiple fighters subsequently came forward and said that they wanted to fight Bisping in light of the incident, including UFC middleweight notables such as Chael Sonnen, Vitor Belfort, Demian Maia, Alan Belcher and Nate Marquardt.

On 27 May 2011, it was revealed that Bisping would be one of the coaches of The Ultimate Fighter 14 opposite Jason Miller. There were concerns that Miller had spies in Bisping's training camp, but Bisping was confident that was not true.  Bisping defeated Miller via third round TKO on 3 December 2011 at The Ultimate Fighter 14 finale.

Bisping was expected to face Demian Maia on 28 January 2012 at UFC on Fox 2. However, an injury forced Mark Muñoz out of his bout on the same card with Chael Sonnen and Bisping instead fought Sonnen for a chance to challenge Anderson Silva for the Middleweight title. Sonnen defeated Bisping via unanimous decision.

Bisping was expected to face Tim Boetsch on 21 July 2012 at UFC 149.  However, Bisping was forced out of the bout with an injury and replaced by promotional newcomer Hector Lombard.

Bisping faced Brian Stann on 22 September 2012 at UFC 152. Bisping won the fight via unanimous decision.

Bisping faced former UFC Light Heavyweight Champion Vitor Belfort on 19 January 2013 at UFC on FX: Belfort vs. Bisping in a fight which would have given Bisping a title shot had he won. However, he lost the fight via second-round TKO after getting hit flush by a head kick. According to Bisping, this kick caused the retinal detachment of his right eye. Fear of not being able to compete again prevented him from seeing a doctor.

Bisping went on to face Alan Belcher on 27 April 2013 at UFC 159. In the first round Bisping managed to out-box his opponent and score a brief trip takedown, in addition to landing a solid knee. Bisping then stepped up the pace of the fight in round 2, landing some heavy kicks and multiple combinations of punches. The fight was stopped at 4:29 of round 3 as Bisping inadvertently poked Belcher in the eye, rendering Belcher unable to continue. Bisping won the bout via unanimous technical decision.

Bisping was expected to face Mark Muñoz on 26 October 2013 at UFC Fight Night 30. However, after symptoms of his detached retina became too bad he decided to undergo surgery. He pulled out of the bout on 27 September and was replaced by Lyoto Machida.

After nearly a year away from the sport due to his eye injury, Bisping returned to face Tim Kennedy on 16 April 2014 at The Ultimate Fighter Nations Finale.  He lost the fight via unanimous decision.

In April 2014, it was reported that both Bisping and Brad Tavares were interested in a potential fight.  However, in May 2014, it was announced that Bisping would face Cung Le on 23 August 2014 at UFC Fight Night 48. Bisping won the one-sided fight via TKO in the fourth round.  The win also earned Bisping his first Performance of the Night bonus award.

Bisping faced Luke Rockhold on 8 November 2014 at UFC Fight Night 55. He lost the fight in the second round after being dropped by a head kick and then submitted with a guillotine choke.

Bisping faced C.B. Dollaway on 25 April 2015 at UFC 186. Bisping won the fight by unanimous decision.

Bisping faced Thales Leites on 18 July 2015 at UFC Fight Night 72. He won the back-and-forth fight by split decision.

Bisping was expected to face Robert Whittaker on 15 November 2015 at UFC 193. However, it was announced on 30 September 2015 that Bisping had withdrawn from the bout, citing an elbow injury, and been replaced by Uriah Hall.

Bisping was briefly linked to a fight with Gegard Mousasi on 27 February 2016 at UFC Fight Night 84. However, on 24 December, Bisping was pulled from the bout in favour of a match-up with Anderson Silva at the same event. Bisping won the fight via unanimous decision. Both participants were awarded Fight of the Night honours.

UFC Middleweight Champion 
With an injury to Chris Weidman forcing him to pull out of the fight, Bisping stepped up on only 17 days' notice to face champion Luke Rockhold for a second time on 4 June 2016 at UFC 199. He won via knockout in the first round to become the UFC Middleweight Champion and the first British UFC champion. He was awarded Performance of the Night honours. The result was considered by many MMA media outlets to be one of the biggest upsets in the UFC title fight history, as Bisping took the fight on short notice and had been submitted in their first encounter 18 months earlier.

Bisping faced Dan Henderson in a rematch on 8 October 2016 at UFC 204. Bisping won the fight via unanimous decision and retained the UFC Middleweight Championship. Both fighters were awarded Fight of the Night for their performance.

On 1 March 2017 while on SportsCenter, Dana White announced that Bisping's next title defense would be against the returning former UFC Welterweight Champion Georges St-Pierre sometime in 2017. However, on 11 May 2017, White announced the fight had been cancelled. The UFC and Bisping had wanted to have the fight at UFC 213, as part of International Fight Week in Las Vegas, but St-Pierre announced on his Instagram page that he needed more training to meet the 185-pound weight and would not be ready to fight until November. The pairing eventually took place on 4 November 2017 in the main event at UFC 217. Bisping lost the bout via technical submission due to a rear-naked choke in the third round.

Post-UFC championship and retirement 
Three weeks after losing the Middleweight title, on 25 November 2017 at UFC Fight Night: Bisping vs. Gastelum, Bisping faced Kelvin Gastelum as a replacement for Anderson Silva, who had been suspended by USADA due to failing a drug test. He lost the fight via knockout in the first round.

On 28 May 2018, Bisping officially announced his retirement from MMA competition. In late December 2018, Bisping appeared on The Joe Rogan Experience, elaborating on his retirement from MMA, which he said was due to eye injury suffered in the fight with Kelvin Gastelum.

On 16 March 2019, it was announced at UFC Fight Night: Till vs. Masvidal that Bisping would be inducted in the UFC Hall of Fame under the modern era wing.

On 1 November 2019, he released his book Quitters Never Win: My Life in UFC.

Acting career
On 6 April 2016, Bisping announced that he had landed a role in the film XXX: Return of Xander Cage. Later that month, Bisping revealed that he is a fan of the 1990s television series Twin Peaks and that he had gained a small role in the 2017 continuation of the series. He portrayed Roy Shaw in the sports drama film My Name Is Lenny. Bisping also had a short cameo at the end of the 2018 film Den of Thieves. 

In the summer of 2018, Bisping was announced as one of the four presenters of the reality competition series Hyperdrive, which would be released on Netflix on 21 August 2019.

In November 2020, it was announced that Bisping would be playing the main role in a boxing movie titled The Journeyman, based on Mark Turley's book. In that same month, Bisping appeared as a tournament fighter, Dolph, in the HBO Max series Warrior.

Personal life
Bisping met his Australian wife, Rebecca, in Manchester. The couple have three children and reside in Orange County, California. Their eldest son Callum is an accomplished wrestler, a CIF champion as a high schooler who currently competes in NCAA Division II out of San Francisco State University. Their third child was born just before Bisping set off to the USA for final preparation in his fight against Dan Miller.

Bisping suffers from strabismus, which is a condition in which the eyes are not properly aligned when looking at an object. This was caused by a detached retina injury from the fight with Vitor Belfort at UFC on FX: Belfort vs. Bisping in 2013, which Bisping lost via technical knockout in round two. The loss was considered controversial, as at that time Belfort was on testosterone replacement therapy. Bisping stated his satisfaction after Belfort lost via a knockout from a front kick by Lyoto Machida on 12 May 2018 at UFC 224, in his retirement fight.

Bisping's moniker, "The Count", was given by a ring announcer during a fight.

Bisping made his UFC colour commentary debut on 2 February 2019 at UFC Fight Night 144 in Fortaleza, Brazil, after several appearances in the Dana White‘s Tuesday Night Contender Series commentary team in 2018. He then made his UFC pay-per-view commentary debut on 12 July 2020 at UFC 251 in Abu Dhabi, UAE.

Bisping is a Manchester United fan.

Championships and accomplishments
Ultimate Fighting Championship
UFC Hall of Fame (modern-era wing, class of 2019)
UFC Middleweight Championship (one time)
One successful title defence vs. Dan Henderson
First British champion in UFC history 
Most wins in the UFC Middleweight division history (16)
Most fights in the UFC Middleweight division history (24)
Most total fight time in the UFC Middleweight division history (5:15:15)
Most significant strikes landed in the UFC Middleweight division history (1384)
The Ultimate Fighter 3 Light Heavyweight Tournament Winner
Fight of the Night (Five times) vs. Elvis Sinosic, Denis Kang, Yoshihiro Akiyama, Anderson Silva, Dan Henderson
Performance of the Night (Two times) vs. Cung Le, Luke Rockhold
Tied for seventh most wins in UFC history (20) (w. Georges St. Pierre, Jon Jones, Neil Magny, Rafael dos Anjos)
Retired with most fights in UFC history (29); since surpassed by Jim Miller
Cage Rage Championships
Cage Rage Light Heavyweight Championship (one time)
Cage Warriors Fighting Championship
CWFC Light Heavyweight Championship (one time)
FX3
FX3 Light Heavyweight Championship (one time)
World MMA Awards
2008 International Fighter of the Year
2012 International Fighter of the Year
2016 Upset of the Year vs. Luke Rockhold at UFC 199
2021 Analyst of the Year
2022 Analyst of the Year
MMADNA.nl
2016 Upset of the Year vs. Luke Rockhold

Mixed martial arts record

|-
|Loss
|align=center|30–9
|Kelvin Gastelum
|KO (punch)
|UFC Fight Night: Bisping vs. Gastelum
|
|align=center|1
|align=center|2:30
|Shanghai, China
|
|-
|Loss
|align=center|30–8
|Georges St-Pierre
|Technical Submission (rear-naked choke)
|UFC 217
|
|align=center|3
|align=center|4:23
|New York City, New York, United States
|
|-
|Win
|align=center|30–7
|Dan Henderson
|Decision (unanimous)
|UFC 204
|
|align=center|5
|align=center|5:00
|Manchester, England
|
|-
|Win
|align=center|29–7
|Luke Rockhold
|KO (punches)
|UFC 199
|
|align=center|1
|align=center|3:36
|Inglewood, California, United States
|
|-
|Win
|align=center|28–7
|Anderson Silva
|Decision (unanimous) 
|UFC Fight Night: Silva vs. Bisping
|
|align=center|5
|align=center|5:00
|London, England 
|
|-
|Win
|align=center|27–7
|Thales Leites
|Decision (split)
|UFC Fight Night: Bisping vs. Leites
|
|align=center|5
|align=center|5:00
|Glasgow, Scotland
|
|-
|Win
|align=center|26–7
|C. B. Dollaway
|Decision (unanimous)
|UFC 186
|
|align=center|3
|align=center|5:00
|Montreal, Quebec, Canada
|
|-
| Loss
| align=center| 25–7
| Luke Rockhold
| Submission (guillotine choke)
| UFC Fight Night: Rockhold vs. Bisping 
| 
| align=center|2
| align=center|0:57
| Sydney, Australia
| 
|-
|  Win
| align=center| 25–6
| Cung Le
| TKO (knee and punches)
| UFC Fight Night: Bisping vs. Le
| 
| align=center| 4
| align=center| 0:57
| Macau, SAR, China
| 
|-
|  Loss
| align=center| 24–6
| Tim Kennedy
| Decision (unanimous)
| The Ultimate Fighter Nations Finale: Bisping vs. Kennedy
| 
| align=center| 5
| align=center| 5:00
| Quebec City, Quebec, Canada
| 
|-
|  Win
| align=center| 24–5
| Alan Belcher
| Technical Decision (unanimous)
| UFC 159
| 
| align=center| 3
| align=center| 4:31
| Newark, New Jersey, United States
|
|-
|  Loss
| align=center| 23–5
| Vitor Belfort
| TKO (head kick and punches)
| UFC on FX: Belfort vs. Bisping
| 
| align=center| 2
| align=center| 1:27
| São Paulo, Brazil
| 
|-
|  Win
| align=center| 23–4
| Brian Stann
| Decision (unanimous)
| UFC 152
| 
| align=center| 3
| align=center| 5:00
| Toronto, Ontario, Canada
| 
|-
|  Loss
| align=center| 22–4
| Chael Sonnen
| Decision (unanimous)
| UFC on Fox: Evans vs. Davis
| 
| align=center| 3
| align=center| 5:00
| Chicago, Illinois, United States
| 
|-
|  Win
| align=center| 22–3
| Jason Miller
| TKO (knees to the body and punches)
| The Ultimate Fighter: Team Bisping vs. Team Miller Finale
| 
| align=center| 3
| align=center| 3:34
| Las Vegas, Nevada, United States
|
|-
|  Win
| align=center| 21–3
| Jorge Rivera
| TKO (punches)
| UFC 127
| 
| align=center| 2
| align=center| 1:54
| Sydney, Australia
| 
|-
|  Win
| align=center| 20–3
| Yoshihiro Akiyama
| Decision (unanimous)
| UFC 120
| 
| align=center| 3
| align=center| 5:00
| London, England
| 
|-
|  Win
| align=center| 19–3
| Dan Miller
| Decision (unanimous)
| UFC 114
| 
| align=center| 3
| align=center| 5:00
| Las Vegas, Nevada, United States
| 
|-
|  Loss
| align=center| 18–3
| Wanderlei Silva
| Decision (unanimous)
| UFC 110
| 
| align=center| 3
| align=center| 5:00
| Sydney, Australia
| 
|-
| Win
| align=center| 18–2
| Denis Kang
| TKO (punches)
| UFC 105
| 
| align=center| 2
| align=center| 4:24
| Manchester, England
| 
|-
|  Loss
| align=center| 17–2
| Dan Henderson
| KO (punch)
| UFC 100
| 
| align=center| 2
| align=center| 3:20
| Las Vegas, Nevada, United States
| 
|-
| Win
| align=center| 17–1
| Chris Leben
| Decision (unanimous)
| UFC 89
| 
| align=center| 3
| align=center| 5:00
| Birmingham, England
| |
|-
| Win
| align=center| 16–1
| Jason Day
| TKO (punches)
| UFC 85
| 
| align=center| 1
| align=center| 3:42
| London, England
| 
|-
| Win
| align=center| 15–1
| Charles McCarthy
| TKO (arm injury)
| UFC 83
| 
| align=center| 1
| align=center| 5:00
| Montreal, Quebec, Canada
| 
|-
| Loss
| align=center| 14–1
| Rashad Evans
| Decision (split)
| UFC 78
| 
| align=center| 3
| align=center| 5:00
| Newark, New Jersey, United States
| 
|-
| Win
| align=center| 14–0
| Matt Hamill
| Decision (split)
| UFC 75
| 
| align=center| 3
| align=center| 5:00
| London, England
| 
|-
| Win
| align=center| 13–0
| Elvis Sinosic
| TKO (punches)
| UFC 70
| 
| align=center| 2
| align=center| 1:40
| Manchester, England
| 
|-
| Win
| align=center| 12–0
| Eric Schafer
| TKO (punches)
| UFC 66
| 
| align=center| 1
| align=center| 4:24
| Las Vegas, Nevada United States
| 
|-
| Win
| align=center| 11–0
| Josh Haynes
| TKO (punches)
| The Ultimate Fighter: Team Ortiz vs. Team Shamrock Finale
| 
| align=center| 2
| align=center| 4:14
| Las Vegas, Nevada, United States
| 
|-
| Win
| align=center| 10–0
| Ross Pointon
| Submission (armbar)
| CWFC: Strike Force 4
| 
| align=center| 1
| align=center| 2:00
| Coventry, England
| 
|-
| Win
| align=center| 9–0
| Jakob Lovstad
| TKO (submission to punches)
| CWFC: Strike Force 3
| 
| align=center| 1
| align=center| 1:10
| Coventry, England
| 
|-
| Win
| align=center| 8–0
| Miika Mehmet
| TKO (corner stoppage)
| CWFC: Strike Force 2
| 
| align=center| 1
| align=center| 3:01
| Coventry, England
| 
|-
| Win
| align=center| 7–0
| Alex Cook
| Submission (choke)
| FX3: Xplosion
| 
| align=center| 1
| align=center| 3:21
| Reading, England
| 
|-
| Win
| align=center| 6–0
| Dave Radford
| TKO 
| CWFC: Ultimate Force
| 
| align=center| 1
| align=center| 2:46
| Sheffield, England
| 
|-
| Win
| align=center| 5–0
| Mark Epstein
| KO (punch)
| Cage Rage 9
| 
| align=center| 3
| align=center| 4:43
| London, England
| 
|-
| Win
| align=center| 4–0
| Andy Bridges
| KO 
| Pride & Glory 3: Glory Days
| 
| align=center| 1
| align=center| 0:45
| Newcastle upon Tyne, England
| 
|-
| Win
| align=center| 3–0
| Mark Epstein
| TKO (punches and knees)
| Cage Rage 7
| 
| align=center| 2
| align=center| 1:27
| London, England
| 
|-
| Win
| align=center| 2–0
| John Weir
| TKO (punches)
| UK MMA Championship 7: Rage & Fury
| 
| align=center| 1
| align=center| 0:50
| Manchester, England
| 
|-
| Win
| align=center| 1–0
| Steve Mathews
| TKO (strikes)
| Pride & Glory 2: Battle of the Ages
| 
| align=center| 1
| align=center| 0:38
| Newcastle upon Tyne, England
|

Mixed martial arts exhibition record

| Win
|align=center| 2–0
|  Ross Pointon
| TKO (submission to punches)
| rowspan=2|The Ultimate Fighter 3
| 15 June 2006 (Air date)
|align=center| 1
|align=center| 2:13
|rowspan=2| Las Vegas, Nevada
| 
|-
| Win
|align=center| 1–0
| Kristian Rothaermel
| TKO (punches)
| 27 April 2006 (Air date)
|align=center| 1
|align=center| 3:51
|

Submission grappling record
{| class="wikitable sortable" style="font-size:80%; text-align:left;"
|-
| colspan=8 style="text-align:center;" | 1 Match, 0 Wins, 0 Losses, 1 Draw
|-
!  Result
!  Rec.
!  Opponent
!  Method
!  text-center|  Event
!  Date
!  Division
!  Location
|-

| Draw
| 0–0–1
|  Chael Sonnen
| Draw
| UR Fight 2016
| 20 March 2016
| Superfight
|  Phoenix, Arizona
|-

Pay-per-view bouts

Filmography

Film

Television

See also
 List of current UFC fighters
 List of male mixed martial artists

Books 
 Michael Bisping - Quitters Never Win: My Life in UFC, Ebury Press (22 August 2019),

References

External links

Michael Bisping official website
Official UFC Profile

|-

1979 births
Living people
English male mixed martial artists
English expatriate sportspeople in the United States
Middleweight mixed martial artists
Light heavyweight mixed martial artists
Mixed martial artists utilizing boxing
Mixed martial artists utilizing Muay Thai
Mixed martial artists utilizing jujutsu
Mixed martial artists utilizing kickboxing
Mixed martial artists utilizing Brazilian jiu-jitsu
English male kickboxers
Light heavyweight kickboxers
English jujutsuka
English Muay Thai practitioners
People from Clitheroe
English people of Irish descent
English people of Polish descent
The Ultimate Fighter winners
Ultimate Fighting Championship champions
Ultimate Fighting Championship male fighters
English practitioners of Brazilian jiu-jitsu